Eastern Bengali, Baṅgālī or Vaṅga is a nonstandard dialect cluster of Bengali language spoken in most of Bangladesh and Tripura, thus covering majority of the land of Bengal and surrounding areas.

Names 
It is also known as Baṅgālī, Pūrvavaṅgīẏa, Prācya, Vaṅga, or Vaṅgīẏa. Chatterji often cited a more generalised variant of Eastern Bengali which he dubbed Typical East Bengali for the sake of broader comparison with other varieties of Bengali. Eastern Bengali is often colloquially referred to by the exonym Bangal Bhasha in West Bengal due to its association with Bangals. It may also be referred to by names such as Khaisi-Gesi Bangla, emphasising the contrast between Eastern Bengali varieties and the standard language in terms of grammar by use of the example phrases "I have eaten" ( kheẏechhi in Standard Bengali but  khaisi in Typical East Bengali) and "I have gone" ( giẏechhi in Standard Bengali but  gesi in Typical East Bengali). A similar name, Khaitesi-Zaitesi Bangla, instead juxtaposes the examples of "I am eating" ( khacchhi in Standard Bengali but  khaitesi in Typical East Bengali) and "I am going" ( jacchhi in Standard Bengali but  zaitesi in Typical East Bengali).

Geographical distribution 
Suniti Kumar Chatterji, describing the cluster as "Vaṅga Dialects", further divided it into two groups of two: "Western and Southwestern Vaṅga" and "Eastern and Southeastern Vaṅga". Eastern Vaṅga is spoken across the modern Bangladeshi division of Sylhet and the Greater Comilla region of Chittagong along with the Barak Valley Division of Assam and the state of Tripura in India. Southeastern Vaṅga is spoken in the remaining area of the Chittagong division, corresponding to the former colonial territories of Noakhali District and Chittagong District, and historically extended further into Sittwe. Western Vaṅga is spoken across the Bangladeshi divisions of Mymensingh, Dhaka, and Barisal. Southwestern Vaṅga is spoken across the Khulna Division, where Eastern Bengali transitions into Central Standard Bengali.

Dr. Muhammad Shahidullah divided all Bengali dialects into two groups: Prācya and Pāścātya. Within his Prācya grouping, he created the divisions of "Southeastern" and "Extreme Eastern", which approximately correspond to Chatterji's "Western and Southwestern Vaṅga" and "Eastern and Southeastern Vaṅga", respectively. The Southeastern group is spoken across the modern Bangladeshi divisions of Mymensingh, Dhaka, Barisal, and Khulna, as well as the Greater Noakhali region of the Chittagong division and eastern parts of the 24 Parganas district in West Bengal. The Extreme Eastern group is spoken across the Bangladeshi divisions Sylhet and Chittagong, including Greater Comilla and excluding Greater Noakhali, as well as the Barak Valley division of Assam.

Gopal Haldar, in his study of Eastern Bengali, divided all East Bengali dialects into four groups. Group I or "Central East Bengali" spans the modern Bangladeshi divisions of Mymensingh, Dhaka, Faridpur, and Barisal, as well as the district of Chandpur in Chittagong Division. The de facto Standard East Bengali spoken around the Bikrampur region is a member of this group, comparable to Chatterji's "Typical East Bengali". Group II or "Central North East Bengali" is spoken in eastern areas of the Mymensingh and Dhaka divisions, the western half of the Sylhet Division, as well as the Brahmanbaria District of the Chittagong Division. Group III or "North East Bengali" is spoken in the eastern half of the Sylhet Division as well as the bordering Barak Valley division of Assam, India. Group IV or "South East Bengali" is spoken in the Chittagong Division, notably excluding the Greater Comilla region. The Comilla District and Tripura state of India, the Bengalis in the latter chiefly being migrants from the former, sit at the confluence of all the major groupings and thus the speech of this region shares features with all the major groups classified by Haldar. Transitionary East Bengali is spoken in the Khulna division as well as Western Greater Faridpur i.e. Rajbari District, which shares features with both Standard Bengali and Eastern Bengali dialects.

Phonology 
Eastern Bengali is characterised by a considerably smaller phoneme inventory when compared with Standard Bengali.

Metathesis
Eastern Bengali notably preserves metathesis from an earlier stage of Bengali. Thus, the equivalent of Sādhu Bhāṣā  (ISO-15919: kariẏā) 'having done' in Typical East Bengali is [koi̯ɾä], having gone through the medial phase of *[kɔi̯ɾiä]; by comparison, the Standard Bengali equivalent is [kore], as the standard language has undergone the additional phonological processes of syncope and umlaut, unlike most Eastern Bengali dialects. Similar occurrences of metathesis occur in the case of consonant conjuncts containing ‍্য jôphôla, due to the fact that it had, in earlier Bengali, also represented the addition of the semivowel [i̯] at the end of a conjunct containing it in addition to its current standard usage of simply geminating the previous consonant in the conjunct.  (ISO-15919: satya, 'truth'), for example, pronounced [ʃɔt̪ːi̯ɔ] in earlier Bengali, is pronounced [ʃoi̯t̪ːo] in Eastern Bengali and [ʃot̪ːo] in Standard Bengali. Metathesis also occurs in the case of consonant conjuncts which were once pronounced with [i̯] as a component even if they do not contain ‍্য jôphôla itself, such as ক্ষ (ISO-15919: kṣa), whose value in earlier Bengali was [kːʰi̯]. Hence  (ISO-15919: rākṣasa, 'rakshasa'), with the earlier Bengali pronunciation of [räkːʰi̯ɔʃ], is pronounced [räi̯kːʰɔʃ] or [räi̯kːɔ́ʃ] in Eastern Bengali and [räkːʰoʃ] in Standard Bengali. Such is also the case for the conjunct জ্ঞ (ISO-15919: jña), which had the value of [gːĩ̯] in earlier Bengali. Hence,  (ISO-15919: ājñā, 'order'), with the earlier Bengali pronunciation of [ägːĩ̯ä], has the Typical East Bengali pronunciation of [äi̯gːä] and the Standard Bengali [ägːä̃]. There is also a tendency to hypercorrect, leading to the frequent diphthongisation of vowels with [i̯] if they precede any consonant cluster, even when there is no etymological basis to do so. For example,  (ISO-15919: brāhma, 'Brahmo') has the Standard Bengali pronunciation of [bɾämɦo], or, more commonly, [bɾämːo], but may be pronounced [bɾäi̯mːo] in Eastern Bengali as if it were spelt  (ISO-15919: brāmya).

The vowels [e] and [o] in the standard language are frequently raised to [ɛ] and [u], respectively. The vowel [e] is still often retained as an allophone of [ɛ] that occurs when in the presence of a close vowel such as [i] or [u].
 Although Standard Bengali features distinct nasalised forms of each of its vowels, nasalisation is absent in most dialects of Eastern Bengali with the notable exception of Southeastern Vaṅga.

Like Standard Bengali, Eastern Bengali lacks true retroflexes. However it further fronts the apical postalveolar plosives of the standard language to apico-alveolar.
Most Eastern Bengali dialects have a tendency to voice the intervocalic unvoiced apical postalveolar stops of Standard Bengali. For example,  (ISO-15919: māṭi, 'soil') is pronounced [mät̠i] in Standard Bengali but [mädi] in Eastern Bengali. However, this does not occur in geminates, so  (ISO-15919: ṭāṭṭi, 'latrine') remains relatively unchanged across varieties, being [t̠ät̠ːi] in Standard Bengali and [tätːi] in Eastern Bengali.
 The voiced retroflex flap of Standard Bengali is usually merged with [ɾ] in Eastern Bengali, such that the two phonemes become indistinguishable and allophonic to most speakers.
 Dialects of Eastern Bengali tend to spirantise the Standard Bengali palato-alveolar affricates [t͡ʃ], [t͡ʃʰ], and [d͡ʒ ~ d͡ʒʱ] into [t͡s], [s], and [z], respectively. (ISO-15919: bāccā, 'child') /bät͡sːä ~ bäsːä/ [bäi̯t͡ʃːä],  (ISO-15919: iñci, 'inch') /int͡si ~ insi/ [int͡ʃi],  (ISO-15919: ijjat, 'honour') /izːɔt̪/ [id͡ʒːɔt̪].
The voiceless labial and velar plosives are often spirantised, such that [p] often becomes [ɸ] and [k] often becomes [x] or [ɦ], the latter transformation chiefly occurring intervocalically. Hence  (ISO-15919: pākā, 'ripe'), pronounced [päkä] in Standard Bengali, may variably be pronounced [päɦä], [ɸäɦä], or [ɸäxä] in Eastern Bengali dialects. [k] is often deleted entirely instead of simply being spirantised, especially when in proximity of [i]. For example,  (ISO-15919: bikāla, 'afternoon'), pronounced [bikäl] in Standard Bengali, is frequently pronounced [biäl] in Eastern Bengali.
When followed by a rounded vowel, [ɸ] and [ɦ] are treated as allophones in most dialects of Eastern Bengali. This merger is expanded upon in the Noakhali dialect, where all word-initial [ɸ] (and, by extension, [p]) are pronounced [ɦ], e.g. (ISO-15919: pāgala) 'madman' [pägɔl] → [ɸägɔl] → [ɦägɔl], and by some speakers of the Mymensingh and Comilla dialects, who pronounce all [ɸ] as [ɦ], e.g. (ISO-15919: ḍhupi) [d̠ʱupi] → [dúɸi] → [dúɦi] 'dove'.
 Standard [ʃ] has a tendency to debuccalise to [ɦ] in word-initial position, e.g.  (ISO-15919: śālā) [ʃälä] → [ɦälä] 'brother-in-law', be deleted entirely in word-medial position, e.g.  (ISO-15919: uśāsa) [uʃäʃ] → [uäʃ] 'breath', and be either retained or deleted in word-final position, e.g.  (ISO-15919: mānuṣa) [mänuʃ] → [mänuʃ ~ mänu] 'people'.

Tone 
The aspiration and breathy voice present in Standard Bengali is notably mostly if not entirely absent in Eastern Bengali. The West Bengali linguists Chatterji and Sen described the deaspirated voiced consonants present in Eastern Bengali as being implosive consonants, such that the Standard Bengali phonemes /bʱ/, /d̪ʱ/, /ɖʱ/, /dʒʱ/, and /ɡʱ/ would respectively correspond to //, //, //, /ɗʒ/, and // in Eastern Bengali. However, Animesh K. Pal, a native speaker of Eastern Bengali from Narayanganj, disputed this claim, instead describing the deaspiration as leading to the development of tones.

These tones are not limited to voiced aspirates, but are also present as compensation for the aspiration of consonants that were voiceless aspirates in Standard Bengali. Tone continues to exist in words even if they are not part of a near-identical pair that requires it for the sake of contrast.

Furthermore, the [ɦ] of Standard Bengali is most often deleted in Eastern Bengali dialects. This h-dropping has also been said to result in tone.

Comparison

References

Bibliography 

 
 

 
 

 
 
 

Eastern Indo-Aryan languages
Bengali dialects
Languages of West Bengal
Languages of Bangladesh
Languages of Tripura